Ankeny may refer to:

Ankeny, Iowa
Ankeny, Washington
Ankeny National Wildlife Refuge, Oregon
Ankeny Building in Clinton County, Iowa
Ankeny v. Governor of the State of Indiana, a court case challenging Barack Obama's eligibility to run for president

People
Ankeny (surname)